Estonia first competed as a nation at the 1920 Summer Olympics, two years after the country declared independence from the then warring Russian and German Empires in 1918. The Estonian National Olympic Committee was established in 1923. The first Winter Olympics for independent Estonia were the 1928 Winter Olympics. Estonian athletes took part in the Olympic Games until the country was invaded and occupied by the Soviet Union in 1940. The  1980 Summer Olympics sailing regatta was held in Tallinn, Soviet-occupied Estonia. Since the end of the Soviet occupation in 1991, Estonia has participated in all Olympics. Estonia has won most of its medals in wrestling (11), weightlifting (7), cross-country skiing (7) and athletics (6).

Medal tables

Medals by Summer Games

Medals by Winter Games

Medals by summer sport

Medals by winter sport

List of medalists

Summer Olympics

Winter Olympics

See also
 List of flag bearers for Estonia at the Olympics
 :Category:Olympic competitors for Estonia
 Estonia at the Paralympics

External links
 
 
 
 Olympic Games – Estonian Olympic Committee 
 Estonian Olympic Committee